Rigby's Water World is a privately owned water park in the southern part of Warner Robins, Georgia.

Development 
During its planning, the park claimed it would become "the largest water park in the world." The facility has 17 water slides and walkways with more than 40 water-play implements. Other attractions include an adult pool with a three-tier waterfall, planned as of 2020.

Rigby's Water World is one of the largest water parks in the state of Georgia. Rigby's Water World was opened on July 7, 2018. It featured a  water bucket, 17 slides, and water gadgets for kids. The water park, owned by Steve Rigby, was announced to be a $15 million development project.

Notable events

Temporary closure in August 2018 
In August 2018, the park was forced to shut down temporarily due to reports of a child testing positive for cryptosporidium, a parasite than can cause diarrhea. The health department was notified and a state health agency began an investigation. A few days later, the park owner stated that the park was safe and free of waterborne disease.

Route 96 Music Festival and Christmas Parade 
The park hosted the rock and country music festival in September 2019. It was the endpoint for the 62nd Annual Warner Robins Christmas Parade in December 2019.

COVID-19 impact in summer 2020 
After postponing its 2020 summer season opening due to the COVID-19 pandemic, Rigby's Water World opened its summer season in June 2020.

References

 Buildings and structures in Houston County, Georgia
 Tourist attractions in Houston County, Georgia
2018 establishments in Georgia (U.S. state)